The Electronic Media Union of Trinidad and Tobago is a trade union in Trinidad and Tobago. It main membership base was in the now defunct National Broadcasting Network (NBN) which was the state broadcasting company.

See also

 List of trade unions

Trade unions in Trinidad and Tobago